Shoop Site (designated 33DA20) is a prehistoric archaeological site in Jackson Township and Wayne Township, Dauphin County, Pennsylvania.  It is the site of a large Paleoindian campsite, dated to 9,000-9,500 BC.  It was first discovered in the 1930s by George Gordon, and also studied by Frank Soday who later discovered the Quad site.

It was added to the National Register of Historic Places in 1986.

References

Archaeological sites on the National Register of Historic Places in Pennsylvania
Geography of Dauphin County, Pennsylvania
History of Dauphin County, Pennsylvania
National Register of Historic Places in Dauphin County, Pennsylvania